Vihaali is a Maldivian crime suspense anthology web series written, edited and directed by Ahmed Asim. Produced by Mariyam Rasheedha under Thurukas Films, the series consists of four episodes, each episode approximately 30 minutes. The pilot episode of the first season was released on 3 April 2022 and was concluded on 2 May 2022.

Cast and characters
Lift Golhi
 Ismail Rasheed as Asif
 Nathasha Jaleel as Shazu
 Ahmed Saeed as Hanim
 Mariyam Shifa as Shanee
 Mariyam Haleem as Ameena
 Ali Farooq as Ibrahim
 Abdulla Naseer as Fikuree
 Ali Fizam as Hameed
 Ali Nadheeh as Saif
 Nadheem Hassan as Thief
 Ahmed Suaad as Hussain

Barber
 Hamdhan Farooq as Rimzee
 Shuaib Shifaz as Riffath
 Ahmed Thahuseen as Mujeeb
 MD Sumon as Sumon
 MD Polash Miah as Muneer
 Jamal Hossain as Izzudheen
 Mohamed Afah as Majeed
 Ismail Hossain as Muneer's father
 Hussain Nazim as Hussain
 Mariyam Rasheedha as Ameena

Firimaru
 Ali Farooq as Shakir
 Aminath Rashfa as Aisha
 Mohamed Emau as Naja
 Ali Moosa as Mumthaz
 Ahmed Shaz as Samir
 Ibrahim Rasheed as Police
 Ahmed Shahin as Bentey
 Ibrahim Moosa as Kentey
 Mohamed Rilwan as Murey
 Ismail as Bondhu
 Mohamed Thaufeeq as Driver

Rahmedhu
 Aishath Rishmy as Lai
 Ibrahim Jihad as Muja
 Ali Fizam as Zubba
 Mohamed Rasheed as Nashid
 Abdula Jabbar as Kumar
 Aminath Shaana as Mary
 Aishath Hana as Hana
 Preethi as pharmacist
 Mohamed Samoor as Saaif
 Azaa Saaid Saeed as Zaiko

Episodes

Development
A casting call was made to the general public by Ali Shazleem's Island's Picture on 4 August 2021 followed by a second casting call on 8 August 2021. In August 2021, it was announced that 12 episodes anthology series will be divided into two seasons of six episodes each, all written and directed by Ahmed Asim.

Soundtrack

Release and reception
The first episode of the series was released on 3 April 2022, on the occasion of Ramadan 1443, stars Ismail Rasheed, Nathasha Jaleel, Ahmed Saeed and Mariyam Shifa in lead roles. The second episode titled "Barber" was released on 10 April 2022 and follows the avenging tales of an expatriate. The third episode titled "Firimaru" was released on 17 April 2022 focuses on a married woman, Aisha (Aminath Rashfa) and how her life changes after a one-night stand. The last episode was released on 2 May 2022, on the occasion of Eid al-Fitr 1443, stars Aishath Rishmy and Ibrahim Jihad.

References

Serial drama television series
Maldivian television shows
Maldivian web series